Serine/threonine-protein kinase PFTAIRE-1 is an enzyme that in humans is encoded by the PFTK1 gene.

Interactions
PFTK1 has been shown to interact with SEPT8.

References

Further reading

EC 2.7.11